Stockton Lake is a reservoir located in southeastern Cedar County, northeastern Dade County, and southwestern Polk County, Missouri.
It has three marinas, and 10 public-use areas. It has a "non-development policy," and is surrounded by unspoiled, tree-covered hills. Its banks are owned and operated by the Army Corps of Engineers.

Stockton Lake is one of Missouri's seven major lakes, all man-made. It was formed by damming the Sac River near the city of Stockton in 1969. The lake is crossed by three state highways over a network of six bridges.  A pipeline carries water from Stockton Lake to Fellows Lake in northern Greene County to help supplement water for the city of Springfield. Stockton lake has numerous coves protected from the wind making it a great lake to wakeboard, water ski or other water sports.

Stockton Dam and hydroelectric power plant
After the USACE construction was complete on the  dam, the lake began filling in 1969. Stockton Lake is operated primarily for flood control and hydroelectric generation and originally had an installed capacity of 45.2 MW in a single electric generator.

The original powerhouse of the dam had a single  six-bladed Kaplan turbine designed by Newport News Shipbuilding and Dry Dock Company and a General Electric generator rated at 45.2 MW. The original turbine was placed in service in 1973. After years of heavy vibration and a poorly matched turbine design, one of the blades catastrophically failed in February 2009, causing an immediate shutdown of the plant. The sheared off blade, weighing , was later recovered from the river. The turbine runner was repaired in 2010 by welding the old blade back in place. Other cracks were also discovered and repaired at this time.

While the repaired turbine was operating, the Corps of Engineers and contractors tried to determine how to correct the issues at Stockton Dam. Analysis concluded that the original turbine was likely rated for a much different site due to its ability to spin at nearly full power without tilting the blades past their "full flat" setting. Why the turbine and generator were mismatched has not been determined. Due to the significant issues and age of the turbine, an entirely new one was custom designed for replacement in 2014-2015. Upgrades for the $48 million project include:
 The new 71,700-horsepower Kaplan turbine runner, with 7 bolt on blades (rather than 6), 75 rpm
 rewiring the generator windings of the rotor and stator
 electrical rating increase to 52 MW
 new digital excitation system, surface air coolers, and digital governor for the generator
 refurbishment of the mechanical accessories
 161 kV main power transformer replacement
 Intake gate and draft tube bulkhead repairs
 Salvage and in-place blade repair
 emergency diesel generator replacement
 asbestos abatement and lead paint removal.

The Stockton Power Plant is a peaking plant that produces 55 GWh of average annual energy valued at $8.3 million. The new, more efficient turbine was installed in 2014 and became operational in January 2015. Part of the costs of the repair were offset by the American Recovery and Reinvestment Act. The old turbine was placed on a pedestal above the road which crosses the dam.

Stockton Equestrian Trail
Stockton Lake features an equestrian trail that is approximately 15 miles long and travels in close proximity along the lake shore from Hawker Point to Orleans Trail Campgrounds. This is a multi use trail for Hikers and Mountain biking, there are no motorized vehicles allowed.

Sailing at Stockton

The great sailing conditions are fueled by winds from Oklahoma and Kansas, consistently blowing from west to east across the lake.  About one-third of the 300 mile lake is accessible to sailboats, the bridges across the lake on Highway 215 and 245 prevent most sail boats from going farther on the lake, but this section of lake is still an ideal location for sailing.  The Stockton Yacht club holds annual races on the lake that usually draw large numbers of boats, with the most prestigious of these races being the Governor's Cup Regatta.

References

External links
http://www.stockton-lake.com/
http://www.nwk.usace.army.mil/Locations/DistrictLakes/StocktonLake.aspx
Upgrades and costs of new turbine: http://www.swpa.gov/PDFs/Hydro/2014Meeting/Stockton-Rehabilitation_HentschelWankum.pdf

Dams in Missouri
Lakes of the U.S. Interior Highlands
Protected areas of Cedar County, Missouri
Protected areas of Dade County, Missouri
Protected areas of Polk County, Missouri
Buildings and structures in Cedar County, Missouri
Buildings and structures in Dade County, Missouri
Buildings and structures in Polk County, Missouri
Reservoirs in Missouri
Bodies of water of the Ozarks
United States Army Corps of Engineers dams
Bodies of water of Cedar County, Missouri
Bodies of water of Dade County, Missouri
Bodies of water of Polk County, Missouri